Martín Berasategui Olazábal is a Spanish chef expert in Basque cuisine and owner of an eponymous restaurant in Lasarte-Oria (Gipuzkoa), Spain.  Since 2001 it has been awarded three Michelin stars. He holds twelve stars in total, more than any other Spanish chef.

Biography
At the age of 14, Berasategui began to work in his parents' restaurant, Bodegón Alejandro. When Berasategui began his culinary career, there were no Michelin star restaurants in the Basque Country. He was sent to France to train as a pastry chef when he was 17. At the age of 20 he took over his parents' restaurant, and earned his first Michelin star there by the age of 25.

Berasategui opened his eponymous restaurant in Lasarte-Oria (outside San Sebastián) in 1993. It was awarded a third Michelin star in the 2001 Michelin Guide. The restaurant was voted 29th-best restaurant in the world by Restaurant in both 2008 and 2011, the highest the restaurant has appeared on the list.

As of 2013, he holds more Michelin stars than any other Spanish chef. In addition to his three at Restaurante Martín Berasategui, he holds three at Restaurante Lasarte in Barcelona and another two at M.B. in Tenerife (the largest of the Canary Islands). His restaurant M.B. in the Ritz Carlton Abama resort in Tenerife gained its first Michelin star in the 2010 guide. He most recently received one Michelin star for Oria, the sister restaurant of Lasarte that is also located in the Monument Hotel in Barcelona. In addition to his four Michelin-starred restaurants, he owns a further six around the world including two in the Dominican Republic and one in Mexico, and is opening a further restaurant in Costa Rica in 2014.

It was announced in 2013 that the François Rabelais University would be awarding an honorary doctorate to Berasategui in culinary studies. It is the first time that the university has awarded honorary doctorates to chefs, with Mikuni Kiyomi, Philippe Rochat and Pierre Wynants also receiving the awards.

References

External links
Official website

Basque cuisine
Molecular gastronomy
Head chefs of Michelin starred restaurants
Living people
1960 births
Spanish chefs
Spanish expatriates in France
People from San Sebastián
Spanish gastronomes